Portugal participated in the Eurovision Song Contest 1997 in Dublin. Célia Lawson represented Portugal with the song "Antes do adeus".

Before Eurovision

Festival da Canção 1997 
Festival da Canção 1997 was the 34th edition of the festival, and was used to select the 33rd Portuguese entry at the Eurovision Song Contest.

Final 
Before the final there were 5 semi-finals, which televoting selected one song from each semi-final to qualify for the final. The final was held at the Coliseu dos Recreios in Lisbon on 7 March 1997, hosted by António Sala and Cristina Caras Lindas. Eight songs competed in the final, with the winner selected by 20 regional juries and a 21st jury made up of televoting results, which was won by Os Meninos da Sacristia. The winner was Célia Lawson with "Antes do adeus".

At Eurovision
Heading into the final of the contest, RTÉ reported that bookmakers ranked the entry 15th out of the 25 entries. In Dublin, Portugal scored 0 points placing last 24th (with Norway).

Voting
Portugal did not receive any points at the 1997 Eurovision Song Contest.

References

1997
Countries in the Eurovision Song Contest 1997
Eurovision